Miklós Sárkány (August 15, 1908 – December 20, 1998) was a Hungarian water polo player and Olympic gold medalist.

Career
He competed in the 1932 Summer Olympics and the 1936 Summer Olympics. He was born in Budapest.

In 1932 he was part of the Hungarian team that won the gold medal, though he played only one match.

Four years later he again won the gold medal with the Hungarian team, playing three matches at the historic 1936 Summer Olympics in Berlin, sponsored by the Nazi government.  Sárkány was Jewish and was one of around thirteen Jewish athletes who won medals.Many Hungarian Jews shared their fellow citizens' passion for sport and viewed participation as a means of assimilation. In the 1930s, however, the antisemitism of the fascist, pro-Nazi Hungarian government pervaded some fields of sport. In September of 1935, Nazi Germany passed the Nuremberg Laws, having boycotted Jewish businesses forcing many to close, the laws stripped Jews of their German citizenship, barred them from many professions such as theatre, law, and medicine, removed their right to vote or hold office, greatly limited their ability to attend public schools, Universities or obtain doctorates, and prevented them from being treated at Municipal hospitals.

He died on 20 December 1998 in Vienna, Austria. He was cremated at Feuerhalle Simmering, where his ashes are buried. His 1932 Olympic team member Sándor Ivády died one day later.

See also
 Hungary men's Olympic water polo team records and statistics
 List of Olympic champions in men's water polo
 List of Olympic medalists in water polo (men)
 List of select Jewish water polo players

References

External links
 

1908 births
1998 deaths
Hungarian male water polo players
Hungarian Jews
Water polo players at the 1932 Summer Olympics
Water polo players at the 1936 Summer Olympics
Olympic gold medalists for Hungary in water polo
Medalists at the 1936 Summer Olympics
Medalists at the 1932 Summer Olympics
Burials at Feuerhalle Simmering
Water polo players from Budapest
20th-century Hungarian people